The men's 1500 metres at the 2010 African Championships in Athletics were held on July 31 – August 1.

Medalists

Results

Heats
Qualification: First 4 of each heat (Q) and the next 4 fastest (q) qualified for the final.

Final

External links
Results

1500
1500 metres at the African Championships in Athletics